Kevin Barry (born 1969) is an Irish writer. He is the author of three collections of short stories and three novels. City of Bohane was the winner of the 2013 International Dublin Literary Award. Beatlebone won the 2015 Goldsmiths Prize and is one of seven books by Irish authors nominated for the 2017 International Dublin Literary Award, the world's most valuable annual literary fiction prize for books published in English. His 2019 novel Night Boat to Tangier was longlisted for the 2019 Booker Prize. Barry is also an editor of  Winter Papers, an arts and culture annual.

Biography
Born in Limerick, Barry spent much of his youth travelling, living in 17 addresses by the time he was 36. He lived variously in Cork, Santa Barbara, Barcelona, and Liverpool before settling in Sligo, purchasing and renovating a run-down Royal Irish Constabulary barracks. His decision to settle down was driven primarily by the increasing difficulty in moving large quantities of books from house to house. In Cork Barry worked as a freelance journalist, contributing a regular column to the Irish Examiner. Keen to become a writer, he purchased a caravan and parked it in a field in West Cork, spending the next six months writing what he described as a "terrible novel'.

Barry has described himself as "a raving egomaniac", one of those "monstrous creatures who are composed 99 per cent of sheer, unadulterated ego" and "hugely insecure and desperate to be loved and I want my reader to adore me, to a disturbing, stalkerish degree." He is highly ambitious, saying: "I won't be happy until I'm up there, receiving the Nobel Prize." He confessed to "haunting bookshops and hiding" to "spy on the short fiction section and see if anyone's tempted by my sweet bait" and has also placed copies of his own work in front of books by other "upcoming" authors.

In 2007 he won the Rooney Prize for Irish Literature for his short story collection There are Little Kingdoms. In 2011 he released his debut novel City of Bohane, which was followed in 2012 by the short story collection Dark Lies the Island. Barry won the International Dublin Literary Award for his novel City of Bohane in 2013. When City of Bohane was shortlisted for the award in April 2013, Barry said: "Anything that keeps a book in the spotlight, and keeps people talking about books is good. [...] And a prize with money attached to it has a lot of prestige." He received €100,000 for winning the award. The prize jury included Salim Bachi, Krista Kaer, Patrick McCabe, Kamila Shamsie, Clive Sinclair and Eugene R. Sullivan. Lord Mayor of Dublin Naoise Ó Muirí said he was "thrilled" that someone of "such immense talent [should] take home this year's award". Ó Muirí also said the characters were "flamboyant and malevolent, speaking in a vernacular like no other." In November, 2015 Beatlebone won the £10,000 Goldsmith’s Prize that aims to reward British and Irish fiction that breaks the mould or extends the possibilities of the novel form.

The Gazette described him as: "If Roddy Doyle and Nick Cave could procreate, the result would be something like Kevin Barry."

Barry was the Ireland Fund Artist-in-Residence in the Celtic Studies Department of St. Michael's College at the University of Toronto in October 2010.

Bibliography

Novels
 City of Bohane (2011)
 Beatlebone (2015)
 Night Boat to Tangier (2019)

Short fiction 
Collections
 There are Little Kingdoms (2007)
 Dark Lies the Island (2012)
 That Old Country Music (2020)
Stories

Awards and honours
 2007: Rooney Prize for Irish Literature (There are Little Kingdoms)
 2011: Costa Book Award, shortlist (City of Bohane)
 2012: The Sunday Times EFG Private Bank Short Story Award (Beer Trip to Llandudno)
 2012: Authors' Club First Novel Award (City of Bohane)
 2013: International Dublin Literary Award (City of Bohane)
 2013: Edge Hill University Short Story Prize  (Dark Lies the Island)
 2015: Goldsmiths Prize (Beatlebone)
 2020: Elected member of Aosdána
 2022: Edge Hill University Short Story Prize  (That Old Country Music)

References

External links

 Book review of There are Little Kingdoms
 Review of City of Bohane
 Review of Dark Lies the Island
 review of Dark Lies the Island, New York Journal of Books
 Short biography from the Berlin International Literature Festival

1969 births
Living people
21st-century Irish novelists
21st-century Irish male writers
21st-century Irish short story writers
Irish male novelists
Irish male short story writers
Writers from Limerick (city)
The New Yorker people
Goldsmiths Prize winners